Denise van Deventer (née Hannema) (born 9 December 1990) is a Dutch international cricketer who debuted for the Dutch national side in 2008, and was appointed its captain in 2015. In June 2018, she was named in the Netherlands' squad for the 2018 ICC Women's World Twenty20 Qualifier tournament. In August 2019, she was named in the Dutch squad for the 2019 ICC Women's World Twenty20 Qualifier tournament in Scotland.

References

External links
 

1990 births
Dutch women cricket captains
Dutch women cricketers
Living people
Netherlands One Day International cricketers
Netherlands Twenty20 International cricketers
Sportspeople from Amsterdam